Thérèse Anne Coffey (born 18 November 1971) is a British politician serving as Secretary of State for Environment, Food and Rural Affairs since October 2022. A member of the Conservative Party, she previously served as Deputy Prime Minister of the United Kingdom and Secretary of State for Health and Social Care from September to October 2022 and as Secretary of State for Work and Pensions from 2019 to 2022. Coffey, the first woman to hold the title of Deputy Prime Minister, has been the Member of Parliament (MP) for Suffolk Coastal since 2010. 

Coffey served under Prime Minister Theresa May as a Parliamentary Under-Secretary of State at the Department for Environment, Food and Rural Affairs from 2016 to 2019, before serving under Prime Minister Boris Johnson as a Minister of State at the same department from July to September 2019. In September 2019, after Amber Rudd resigned from Johnson's Cabinet, Coffey was appointed to the post of Secretary of State for Work and Pensions. After Johnson resigned in 2022, Coffey supported Liz Truss's bid to become Conservative leader. Coffey and Truss are close friends and political allies. Following Truss's appointment as Prime Minister, she made Coffey Secretary of State for Health and Social Care, and Deputy Prime Minister. After Truss resigned, Coffey was appointed by Rishi Sunak as the Secretary of State for Environment, Food and Rural Affairs.

Early life
The daughter of T. G. Coffey and Alice George, Coffey was born on 18 November 1971 in St Helens, Merseyside, and grew up in Liverpool. Educated at St Mary's College, Crosby, and St Edward's College, Liverpool, she went to Somerville College, Oxford in 1989 to study chemistry. However, in 1991 she was required to withdraw from the college on academic grounds, having obtained poor examination results attributed to over-involvement in extracurricular activities. Coffey then attended University College London, where she obtained a BSc degree (with upper second class honours) in chemistry in 1993 and later a PhD in chemistry in 1998. After graduating Coffey worked in a number of roles for Mars Incorporated, including as finance director for Mars Drinks UK. She then worked for the BBC as a finance manager in the Property division.

Early career
In the European Parliament elections in June 2004, Coffey stood for election to the European Parliament for South East England. The Conservative Party won 35.2% of the vote, giving it four seats, but Coffey was seventh on the list in this proportional representation system, and was not elected.

Coffey stood as Conservative Party candidate for Wrexham at the 2005 general election. She came third with 6,079 votes (20% of the vote).

In 2009, at the European elections, Coffey was living in Andover, Hampshire; she missed out by one place on being elected to the European Parliament for South East England. The Conservative Party won 34.79% of the vote, giving it four seats, and placing her fifth on the party list.

Parliamentary career
At the 2010 general election, Coffey was elected for Suffolk Coastal, becoming the constituency's first female MP. Coffey received 25,475 votes (46.4% of the vote), an increase of 1.8% on John Gummer's 2005 campaign. She is a supporter of the Free Enterprise Group.

On 6 July 2011, Coffey defended Rebekah Brooks over the News of the Worlds involvement in the news media phone hacking scandal. She said a "witch hunt" was developing against Brooks, and that simply to say Brooks was editor of the newspaper at the time was not enough evidence against her. Coffey became a member of the Culture, Media and Sport Select Committee inquiry into the hacking scandal in 2012. In that committee, she declined to support any motions critical of Rupert and James Murdoch. However, she later joined the majority of her party in voting for exemplary damages to be a default consequence to deter press misbehaviour.

Early frontbench career 
After serving as a member of the Culture, Media and Sport Committee from July 2010 to October 2012, Coffey was appointed Parliamentary Private Secretary to Michael Fallon, Minister for Business and Energy. In July 2014, she was appointed an assistant Government whip.

In 2013, Coffey voted against the legalisation of same-sex marriage, stating: "I shall be voting against the Bill because my perspective on what marriage is really about is different from that of some other Members ... for me it is fundamentally still about family, the bedrock of society." She again voted against same-sex marriage in 2019 when Parliament considered the same question for Northern Ireland.

Coffey was appointed Deputy Leader of the House of Commons on 11 May 2015.

In the House of Commons she sat on the Environmental Audit Committee from September 2017 to November 2019.

Coffey's decision to write a paper for the Free Enterprise Group recommending pensioners should pay National Insurance contributions  provoked criticism among some older constituents, who claimed that in an already tough economic environment, it was wrong to tax pensioners further. Coffey said that she had "no regrets writing about National Insurance" and that it was "a policy proposal – it is by no means, at this stage, anymore than that".

Coffey also faced criticism from some Suffolk residents over her support for the Government's proposal to sell off forestry and woodland in public ownership, in 2011. Protesters argued that "experience shows us that when private landowners come in they close car parks and make access as difficult as possible". The Government later dropped the proposal.

In October 2016, Coffey was criticised by the then Liberal Democrat leader Tim Farron for accepting hospitality worth £890 from Ladbrokes after supporting the gambling industry in Parliament as part of the Culture, Media and Sport Committee;  she denied that she had been "influenced in her considerations on matters of related policy by any hospitality received".

Coffey voted in favour of a UK referendum on EU membership and consistently voted to proceed with the Brexit process. In July 2016, Coffey joined the Department for Environment, Food and Rural Affairs as Parliamentary Under-Secretary of State for Environment and Rural Opportunities, under Theresa May, and when Boris Johnson became Prime Minister in July 2019, Coffey was promoted to Minister of State.

Secretary of State for Work and Pensions 

Following the resignation of Amber Rudd in September 2019, Coffey joined the Cabinet as Secretary of State for Work and Pensions. She retained her position in Johnson's February 2020 cabinet reshuffle.

In June 2020, Coffey responded to Marcus Rashford's campaign for free school meals for children during the COVID-19 pandemic, which included a tweet from Rashford urging the Government to remember Britain's poorest families. One of his tweets read, in part: "When you wake up this morning and run your shower, take a second to think about parents who have had their water turned off during lockdown." Coffey's response to his campaign was only "Water cannot be disconnected though", which he and others considered dismissive. She subsequently deleted her comment and asserted her help and support for Rashford.

In September 2021, Coffey was accused of miscalculating the amount of work a Universal Credit claimant would need to do in order to make up for the proposed end of the £20-a-week increase in benefits, brought in to assist people during the COVID-19 pandemic. Speaking to BBC Breakfast, Coffey said: "We're conscious that £20 a week is about two hours' extra work every week – we will be seeing what we can do to help people perhaps secure those extra hours, but ideally also to make sure they're also in a place to get better paid jobs, as well." However, given Universal Credit's "taper rate" of 63%, a Universal Credit claimant sees their credit reduced by 63p for every pound they generate from work.

In January 2022, Coffey tweeted support for prime minister Boris Johnson (in regard to Partygate allegations), stating that she considered his apology to be sincere.

In June 2022, Coffey said that, as a practising Catholic, she opposed abortion but did not condemn those who have an abortion. She had previously tabled a motion in 2010 calling for mental health assessments for those seeking abortion, and she also voted against extending abortion rights to people in Northern Ireland. Her views on abortion were criticised by Clare Murphy, CEO of the British Pregnancy Advisory Service.

Coffey continued to defend Johnson in July 2022 when he was accused of overlooking MP Chris Pincher's alleged sexual misconduct when he was appointed Deputy Chief Whip. Coffey went on record to say that Johnson was "not aware" of "specific" allegations relating to Pincher. She went on to say in several interviews that she felt Johnson had dealt with the issue decisively.

Coffey was campaign manager for Liz Truss in the Parliamentary stages of the July–September 2022 Conservative Party leadership election, and she remained in a campaign role in the members' vote stage of the election.

Deputy Prime Minister and Health Secretary 

Truss appointed Coffey as Deputy Prime Minister and Health and Social Care Secretary in her new government on 6 September 2022. Her appointment made her the first woman to serve as Deputy Prime Minister. In September 2022, Coffey identified four priorities for the Department of Health “A, B, C, D” – ambulances, backlog, care, and doctors and dentists.

In response to nursing strike ballots over the cost-of-living crisis, Coffey said that nurses can leave "if they want to", stating that there are a large number of international nurses willing to work in the UK. These comments came following a minimum estimated 38,000 nurse shortage; the number of nurses leaving the NHS in London had risen by 24% the past year and more than two-thirds of NHS trusts were reporting a "significant or severe impact" from staff leaving for better paid jobs in retail and hospitality.

On 15 October 2022, it was reported Coffey was planning to allow people to obtain antibiotics from pharmacists without a prescription from a  general practitioner, which led to criticism by medical experts due to it increasing the risk of antimicrobial resistance (AMR). At the same time, she received criticism for admitting to giving her own supply of antibiotics to others, which also increases the risk of AMR. This act – of sharing an antibiotics prescription with others – was also described as being illegal.

On 18 October 2022, Dan Poulter – a medical doctor and former Conservative health minister – criticised Coffey's failure to tackle smoking and obesity, saying it leads to worse health and strains the NHS. Since entering the House of Commons in 2010 Coffey has repeatedly voted against measures to restrict smoking, including the ban on smoking in enclosed public spaces and the requirement that cigarettes be sold in plain packaging. She also accepted £1,100 in hospitality and gifts from Gallaher Group tobacco firm.

Secretary of State for Environment, Food and Rural Affairs 
Following Rishi Sunak's appointment as Prime Minister, Coffey was retained in Sunak's cabinet and appointed Secretary of State for Environment, Food and Rural Affairs on 25 October 2022, but lost her position as Deputy Prime Minister. She has previously held the positions of Parliamentary Under-Secretary of State and Minister of State for Environment and Rural Opportunity within the Department for Environment, Food and Rural Affairs.

On 23 February 2023, Therese Coffey was condemned for proposing people struggling to afford food to work for more hours to buy food, as well as suggesting that people eat turnips instead of tomatoes during a shortage of salad vegetables in the UK. At the time, food prices increased by 16.8 per cent more than last year. Labour MP Rachael Maskell said, "It's very shocking that the Environment Secretary shifted blame for food poverty onto people because they are on low wages and are poor". Maskell mentioned that people were going hungry and it was a time for the government to support families with food. Coffey acknowledged that inflation was "really tough at the movement" and that support schemes were in place.

Personal life
Coffey is not married and is described as a private person. Her sister Clare has worked in her parliamentary office as a secretary since 2015.

Coffey is an avid football fan, supporting Liverpool Football Club. She signed an early day motion in 2011 set down by Labour Liverpool Walton MP Steve Rotheram requesting a knighthood for Kenny Dalglish. She enjoys gardening, karaoke, and music.

The two accents in "Thérèse" do not appear in the self-written Who's Who, but they are used on Coffey’s personal web site and Hansard also uses them.

Notes

References

External links
ThereseCoffeyMP.com constituency website
ThereseCoffey.com political blog

|-

1971 births
Living people
Female members of the Cabinet of the United Kingdom
Female members of the Parliament of the United Kingdom for English constituencies
Conservative Party (UK) MPs for English constituencies
UK MPs 2010–2015
UK MPs 2015–2017
UK MPs 2017–2019
British accountants
English Roman Catholics
Alumni of Somerville College, Oxford
Alumni of University College London
People educated at St Edward's College
People educated at St Mary's College, Crosby
People from Higher End
Politicians from Liverpool
Members of the Privy Council of the United Kingdom
UK MPs 2019–present
21st-century English women politicians
British Secretaries of State for the Environment
Deputy Prime Ministers of the United Kingdom
Secretaries of State for Health and Social Care
Free Enterprise Group